Noureddine Sammoud (1932 – 11 January 2022) was a Tunisian poet and academic.

Life and career 
Born in Kelibia, Sammoud studied at the Al-Zaytuna Mosque and at the Cairo University, before getting a master's degree in literature at the Lebanese University in 1959. He started his poetic production in 1953, and took part in several national and international literary festivals. His poetry collections, which are generally linked to the Neo-romanticism, were translated in various foreign languages and spanned different styles. During his life he received numerous awards, including the National Merit Award in 1970 and the prize of the Ministry of Cultural Affairs in 1982.

Sammoud died in Kelibia on 11 January 2022, at the age of 89.

References

1932 births
2022 deaths 
People from Nabeul Governorate
Tunisian poets
Academic staff of the University of Ez-Zitouna
Cairo University alumni
Lebanese University alumni